Sheikh Ahmad bin Haji Bashir Mohammed Shafi ( الشيخ ; January 1, 1919 – July 10, 1989) was a Filipino Muslim Ālim and Islamic scholar, leader, and teacher former president and founder of the Agama Islam Society. He was born on 1 January 1919, in Miondas, Tamparan, Lanao del Sur, Philippines.

Election
Sheikh Ahmad was nominated by his close associates and supporters without his knowledge and approval to run as a delegate for the lone district of Lanao del Sur to the Philippine Constitutional Convention of 1971 but lost. He never runs again for any elective post after that.

Personal life
Sheikh Ahmad was married to Hadja Zainab, with whom he had four sons: Monib, Said, Salahudden, Samra and a daughter: Sairah; and concurrently also to Hadja Aminah, with whom he had a son: Mahdi and three daughters: Samiah, Saminah, Sarah. The two families happily lived in two adjacent houses separately as polygamy practice is allowed in Islam.

Education

Early childhood
Sheikh Ahmad received his first non-formal education from his father, and then studied at the School of Islam complete primary school in the city of Marawi.

Education in Mecca
In 1951, Sheikh Ahmad traveled to the Hejaz to continue his education in Mecca. He joined the Al-Falah School in Makkah, a religious science school till he completed his studies in the year 1953, and later joined the Al-Soltiyyah School in the Grand Mosque also in Makkah. He was awarded a degree in Islamic Sciences, which was considered at that time the highest religious education at the Mosque.

Missionary work
Sheikh Ahmad went back to the Philippines after completing his studies. At first, he taught at an Islamic School in Marawi City. He helped created some of the schools in various communities with complete and organized conjunctions with some of his peers, colleagues throughout the years till 1955.

In 1956, Sheikh Ahmad and companions founded the Agama Islam Society, after the establishment of the Shoura Council. The Society founded Islamic schools, ultimately having 363 branches in all regions of the Philippines, visited by more than 5,000 students in the academic year 1986-1987.

Distinguished achievements and activities

In 1972, the Agama Islam Society transferred Ma’had Mindanao Al-Arabie Al-Islamie to Darussalam, Matampay, Marawi City, as the main campus through the assistance of Sheikh Esmail Laut Sarip and former Lanao del Sur Governor, Sultan sa Masiu, Hon. Mohammad Ali Dimaporo for the exclusion of this land from military reservation pursuant to Proclamation No. 2223 signed by the President of the Republic of the Philippines, President Ferdinand E. Marcos.

As president of the Agama Islam Islam, Sheikh Ahmad had been associated in various Islamic Associations in the Philippines, and also played a role in their creation. He was president of the National Union of Arab-Islamic Schools in the Philippines. President of the Local Council of Mosques in the Philippines. He attended international conferences with a theme in Islamic mission including the Kingdom of Saudi Arabia, Iraq, Malaysia, Pakistan, Qatar, Indonesia, Tunisia, Egypt & Others (from 1381 to 1406 Hijri).

He wrote thirteen books, including Islamic, Arabic, and Muslim history in the Philippines. His collection of Qur’an and Islamic Manuscripts has been cited multiple times around the world. The establishment of now-defunct Saudi and Philippines Publishing Center in 1980, Parañaque, Metro Manila, financed by King Khalid ibn Abdulaziz Al-Saud. The establishment of the Jamiatu Muslim Mindanao in 1987. The completion of Maranao translation of the Quran was reviewed by a committee of Maranao Scholars headed by Ahmad Bashir, and also Islamic manuscripts of Sheikh Ahmad collection.

Sheikh Ahmad had closely worked both with NGO and government various organizations, agencies, leaders, such as former senator Domocao Alonto and former Philippines Ambassador to Saudi Arabia Lininding Pangandaman for the welfare of the Maranaos.

Agama Islam Society
The basis of the creation of the society was through consultative council, which some academicians were from Marawi City, the Philippines under the chairmanship of Sheikh Ahmad Bashir year 1375H – 1955G. This Council established the society to propagate Islam in 1956.

Death
Sheikh Ahmad did not use his opportunities for his personal advantage, and died poor, without owning or bequeathing any property.

He died in Iligan City from complications of diabetes on the 7th day of Dhul Hijjah 1409 AH (July 10, 1989). His remains were buried in Marawi City, Philippines.

Notes and references

External links
Jamiatu Muslim Mindanao
Al-rawdah.Net

1919 births
1989 deaths
Filipino Sunni Muslim scholars of Islam
20th-century imams
People from Lanao del Sur
Filipino Muslims